The prevalence of circumcision is the percentage of males in a given population who have been circumcised, with the procedure most commonly being performed as a part of prophylactic healthcare, a religious obligation, or cultural practice. Yosha & Bolnick & Koyle (2012) states that the global incidence of circumcision has risen and seems likely to continue to do so during the "first half of the twenty-first century". 

Since 2010, both the World Health Organization and Joint United Nations Programme on HIV/AIDS have been promoting a higher rate of international circumcision prevalence as a prophylaxis against HIV transmission and other pathological conditions, specifically in areas with high HIV transmission and low circumcision rates. According to Hay & Levin, 2012, around 50% of all circumcisions worldwide are performed for reasons of prophylactic healthcare, while the other 50% are predominately performed for religious or cultural reasons.

Overview

Present 
Rates vary widely, from over 90% in Israel and many Muslim-majority countries, 86.3% in South Korea, to 80% in the United States, to 58% in Australia, to 45% in South Africa, to 20.7% in the United Kingdom, to under 1% in Japan and Honduras. 

In 2016, the global prevalence of circumcision was estimated to be around 38%, with notable increases of circumcision prevalence seen in the United States, the Middle East; and Africa; major medical organizations have promoted a higher rate of circumcision in Africa as a preventive against the spread of HIV/AIDS. In 2020, the World Health Organization reiterated that it is an efficacious prophylactic intervention in if carried out by medical professionals under safe conditions in areas of high HIV/AIDS prevalence. The World Health Organization recommends early infant circumcision of male neonates without medical contraindications in these areas. Reliable sources differ on whether the organization takes a position in developed nations.

Current circumcision incidence and prevalence in the United States is approximately 80% due to support from the country's medical community as a prophylactic health intervention against disease.  The continent of Africa, similarly, has widely adopted the practice as a preventive measure against the spread of HIV. While it has overwhelming prevalence in the Muslim world and in Israel due to the religious beliefs of most Muslims and Jews; however, some non-Muslim groups living within Muslim-majority countries, such as Armenians and Assyrians, do not practice it. It is prevalent in some Muslim-majority countries in southeast Asia such as Indonesia and Malaysia; however, the WHO states that there is "little non-religious circumcision in Asia, with the exceptions of the Republic of Korea and the Philippines". In parts of Africa it is often practiced as part of tribal customs from Christians, Muslims and Animists. In contrast, rates are much lower in most of Europe, parts of southern Africa, most of Asia, Oceania and Latin America, constituting South America, Central America, the Caribbean and Mexico. Australia, Canada, Ireland, New Zealand and the United Kingdom are examples of countries that have seen a decline in male circumcision in recent decades, while there have been indications of increasing demand in southern Africa, partly for preventive reasons due to the HIV epidemic there.

Africa
Studies suggest that about 62% of African males are circumcised. However, the rate varies widely between different regions, and among ethnic and religious groups, with Muslim North Africans practising it for religious reasons, central Africans as part of ethnic rituals or local custom, and some traditionally non-circumcising populations in the South recently adopting the practice due to measures by the World Health Organisation to prevent AIDS. Williams, B.G. et al. commented that: "Most of the currently available data on the prevalence of [male circumcision] are several decades old, while several of the recent studies were carried out as adjuncts to demographic and health surveys and were not designed to determine the prevalence of male circumcision."

Less than 20%

Botswana, Rwanda, Eswatini, Zimbabwe.

Between 20% and 80%
Angola, Burundi, Central African Republic, Chad, Congo (Rep), Lesotho, Malawi, Mozambique, Namibia, South Africa, Sudan, Tanzania, Uganda, Zambia.

South Africa 
It is estimated that 48.7% of males are circumcised in South Africa. One national study reported that 54.2% of black Africans were circumcised, with 32.1% of those traditionally circumcised and 13.4% circumcised for medical reasons.

More than 80%
Benin, Burkina Faso, Cameroon, Congo (Dem Rep), Cote d'Ivoire, Djibouti, Equatorial Guinea, Eritrea, Ethiopia, Gabon, Gambia, Ghana, Guinea, Guinea-Bissau, Kenya, Liberia, Mali, Mauritania, Niger, Nigeria, Senegal, Sierra Leone, Somalia, Togo.

Americas

Less than 20%
Less than 20% of the population are circumcised in Argentina, Belize, Bolivia, Brazil, Chile, Colombia, Costa Rica, Cuba, Dominican Republic, El Salvador, Ecuador, French Guiana, Guatemala, Guyana, Haiti, Honduras, Jamaica, Nicaragua, Panama, Paraguay, Peru, Saint Lucia, The Bahamas, Trinidad and Tobago, Uruguay, Venezuela.

The Bahamas 
The reported circumcision rate for younger individuals (age 15-18) is 16.7% (2019).

Argentina 
The circumcision rate among homosexual men in Buenos Aires is reported to be 13% (2013).

Brazil 
The overall prevalence of circumcision is reported to be 6.9%. The reported rate is 13% in Rio de Janeiro, indicating possible differences between urban and rural rates.

Colombia 
The overall prevalence of circumcision is reported to be 6.9%.

Between 20% and 80%

Mexico 
In 2006 the prevalence of circumcision in Mexico was estimated to be 10% to 31%. A recent (2020) HIV study conducted in Mexico City found a participant circumcision rate of 23% (255 / 1118).

Puerto Rico 
In 2012 a random sample of male visitors to a STI center in San Juan were surveyed on various topics, the reported circumcision rate was 32.4%.

Canada

Circumcision in Canada followed the pattern of other English speaking countries, with the practice being adopted during the 1900s, to prevent masturbation and other perceived issues of the time, but with the rate of circumcision declining in the latter part of the 20th century, particularly after a new policy position was released in 1975. The Canadian Paediatric Society estimated that, in 1970, 48 percent of males were circumcised. However, studies conducted in 1977–1978 revealed a wide variation in the incidence of circumcision between different provinces and territories. For example, Yukon reported a rate of 74.8 percent, while Newfoundland reported an incidence of 1.9 to 2.4 percent. The rate continued to drop, with the newborn circumcision rate in Ontario in 1994–95 dropping to 29.9%.

A survey of Canadian maternity practices conducted in 2006/2007, and published in 2009 by the national public health agency, found a newborn circumcision rate of 31.9%. Rates varied markedly across the country, from close to zero in Newfoundland and Labrador to 44.3% in Alberta. In 2015, the Canadian Paediatric Society used those statistics in determining the national circumcision rate it currently quotes.

A more recent survey conducted in 2011 on expecting couples in Saskatchewan (average age 30.3) found the circumcision rate of the male participants to be 61%.

Over 80%

United States
As of 2014, an estimated 80.5% of American men are circumcised, and the prevalence of the procedure is considered to be near-universal in the country. After favorable statements on circumcision were published on circumcision by major medical organizations in the United States, including a 2012 statement on circumcision by the American Academy of Pediatrics (AAP) and a 2014 statement by the Centers of Disease Control and Prevention (CDC), the incidence of circumcision in the United States has likely risen. The CDC has calculated the present rate of circumcision in the United States to be 81%; Morris et al. found a somewhat lower present incidence of 77% in 2010. During the 2000s, the prevalence of circumcision in men aged 14–59 differed by race: 91 percent of non-Hispanic white men, 76 percent of black men, and 44 percent of Hispanic men were circumcised, according to Mayo Clinic Proceedings. Wolters Kluwer estimated that closer to 80% of males in 2021 were circumcised. 

Medicaid funding for infant circumcision used to be available in every state, but starting with California in 1982, 18 states (Arizona, California, Colorado, Florida, Idaho, Louisiana, Maine, Minnesota, Mississippi, Missouri, Montana, Nevada, North Carolina, North Dakota, Oregon, South Carolina, Utah, and Washington) had eliminated Medicaid coverage of routine circumcision by July 2011. One study in the Midwest of the U.S. found that this had no effect on the newborn circumcision rate but it did affect the demand for circumcision at a later time. Another study, published in early 2009, found a difference in the neonatal male circumcision rate of 24% between states with and without Medicaid coverage. The study was controlled for other factors such as the percentage of Hispanic patients. 

The CDC uses two data sources to track circumcision rates. The first is the National Health and Nutrition Examination Survey (NHANES), which records circumcisions performed at any time at any location. The second is the National Hospital Discharge Survey (NHDS), which does not record circumcisions performed outside the hospital setting or those performed at any age following discharge from the birth hospitalization. Methodologically flawed calculations throughout the 2000s and 2010s showed the rate decreasing off of these statistics, but this data is believed to be misleading due to an increasing trend of performing neonatal circumcisions outside of hospitals, a trend not reflected in hospital discharge data.

Circumcision was the second-most common procedure performed on patients under one year of age, after routine inoculations and prophylactic vaccinations. There are various explanations for why the infant circumcision rate in the United States is different from comparable countries. Many parents' decisions about circumcision are preconceived, which may contribute to the high rate of elective circumcision. Brown & Brown (1987) reported the most correlated factor is whether the father is circumcised.

Asia

Less than 20%
Armenia, Bhutan, Burma, China, Cambodia, Hong Kong, India, Japan, Laos, Mongolia, Nepal, North Korea, Papua New Guinea, Singapore, Sri Lanka, Taiwan, Thailand, Vietnam.

India 
According to the National Family Health Survey (NFHS-4) the overall circumcision rate in India is 16%.

China 
The overall prevalence of circumcision in China is reported to be 14%.

Hong Kong 
A sample of children aged < 12 found a circumcision rate of 3.4% (1982) . A survey on men who regularly visit female sex workers from 2012 found a circumcision rate of 28%.

Singapore 
The prevalence of circumcision in Singapore is estimated to be 14.9%.

Taiwan 
It is estimated that the circumcision rate for men aged 20-40 is between 10 and 15%.

Cambodia 
The overall prevalence of circumcision in Cambodia is reported to be 3.5%.

Between 20% and 80%
Indonesia, Kazakhstan, Malaysia, and South Korea.

South Korea
Circumcision is largely a modern-day phenomenon in South Korea. While during the twentieth century the rate of circumcision increased to around 80%, virtually no circumcision was performed prior to 1945, as it was against Korea's long and strong tradition of preserving the body as a gift from parents. A 2001 study of 20-year-old South Korean men found that 78% were circumcised. At the time, the authors commented that "South Korea has possibly the largest absolute number of teenage or adult circumcisions anywhere in the world. Because circumcision started through contact with the American military during the Korean War, South Korea has an unusual history of circumcision." According to a 2002 study, 86.3% of South Korean males aged 14–29 were circumcised. In 2012, it is the case of 75.8% of the same age group. Only after 1999 has some information against circumcision become available (at the time of the 2012 study, only 3% of Korean internet sites, using the most popular Korean search engine Naver, were against indiscriminate circumcision and 97% were for). The authors of the study speculate "that the very existence of information about the history of Korean circumcision, its contrary nature relative to a longstanding tradition, its introduction by the US military, etc., has been extremely influential on the decision-making process regarding circumcision."

More than 80%
Afghanistan, Azerbaijan, Bangladesh, Bahrain, Brunei, Iran, Iraq, Israel, Pakistan, Jordan, Kuwait, Kyrgyzstan, Lebanon, Oman, Palestine, the Philippines, Qatar, Saudi Arabia, Syria, Tajikistan, Turkey, Turkmenistan, Uzbekistan, United Arab Emirates and Yemen.

The overall prevalence of circumcision (tuli) in the Philippines is reported to be 92.5%. Most circumcisions in the Philippines are performed between the ages of 11 to 13.

Europe

Less than 20%
Armenia, Austria, Belarus, Belgium, Bulgaria, Croatia, Czech Republic, Cyprus, Denmark, Estonia, Finland, France, Georgia, Germany, Greece, Hungary, Iceland, Ireland, Italy, Latvia, Lithuania, Malta, Moldova, The Netherlands, Norway, Poland, Portugal, Romania, Russia, Slovakia, Slovenia, Spain, Serbia, Sweden, Switzerland, Ukraine, and the United Kingdom.

Germany (10.9 - 18.8%) 
In Germany, the German Health Interview and Examination Survey for Children and Adolescents found in 2007 that 10.9% of boys aged 0–17 had been circumcised. An online survey of 110,964 German youth (aged ≥ 12) found a circumcision rate of 18.8% (as of March 2023). The majority of the procedures (69%) were performed for medical reasons, while 19% were performed on religious grounds.

United Kingdom (15.8%) 
A national survey on sexual attitudes in 2000 found that 15.8% of men or boys in the United Kingdom (ages 16–44) were circumcised by their parents' choosing, while 11.7% of 16- to 19-year-olds, and 19.6% of 40- to 44-year-olds said they had been circumcised. Apart from black Caribbeans, men born overseas were more likely to be circumcised. Rickwood et al. reported that the proportion of English boys circumcised for medical reasons had fallen from 35% in the early 1930s to 6.5% by the mid-1980s.  an estimated 3.8% of male children in the UK were being circumcised for medical reasons by the age of 15. The researchers stated that too many boys, especially under the age of 5, were still being circumcised because of a misdiagnosis of phimosis. They called for a target to reduce the percentage to 2%.

The Netherlands (9 - 16%) 
Among participants of the HELIUS study, recruited between 2011 and 2015 (age 18-70), the circumcision rate for Dutch men without a migration background was 9%. The rate was > 95% for men of Moroccan, Turkish or Ghanaian background. A small study from 2019 that recruited homosexual men suffering from various STD's found that 16% of the participants were circumcised.

France (14%) 
In France, according to a telephone survey (TNS Sofres Institute, 2008), 14% of men are circumcised.

Bulgaria (13.4%) 
The circumcision rate in Bulgaria is estimated to be 13.4%.

Russia (11.8%) 
The circumcision rate in Russia is estimated to be 11.8%.

Sweden (11.8%) 
A study on Hypospadias (2016), recruited a control group (i.e. men without Hypospadias) via the Swedish Population Registry, the reported circumcision rate of the controls was 11.8%, mean age was 33.

Denmark (1.6 - 7%) 
In 1986, 511 out of approximately 478,000 Danish boys aged 0–14 years were circumcised. This corresponds to a cumulative national circumcision rate of around 1.6% by the age of 15 years.

A recent survey (2017-2018) called Project SEXUS surveyed 62,675 Danes aged 15-89 years on sexual topics. The survey found the male circumcision rate to be 7%. Of the respondents 5% were circumcised for medical or other reasons, while 2% were circumcised for religious or traditional reasons.

Spain (6.6%) 
The overall prevalence of circumcision in Spain is reported to be 6.6%.

Poland (5%) 
A 2017 survey of polish university students (average age - 25) found a circumcision rate of 5%. Note that this figure is an estimate and fully representative only for students of the university where the survey took place.

Slovenia (4.5%) 
In Slovenia, a 1999–2001 national probability sample of the general population aged 18–49 years found that overall, 4.5% of Slovenian male citizens reported being circumcised. Prevalence strongly varied across religious groups, with 92.4% of Muslims being circumcised, 1.7% of Roman Catholics, 0% of other religious affiliations (Evangelic, Serbian Orthodox, other), and 7.1% of those with no religious affiliation.

Finland (2-4%) 
In Finland, the overall prevalence of circumcision is 2–4%, according to a recent publication by the Finnish Health Ministry.

Between 20% and 80%

Belgium, Albania, Kosovo, North Macedonia, and Bosnia and Herzegovina.

Bosnia-Herzegovina (58.7%) 
In Bosnia-Herzegovina the circumcision rate is 58.7% by 2018.

Albania (36.8%) 
In Albania during the years 2008–09 the percentage of men age 15–49 who reported having been circumcised was 47.7%. In the years 2017–18 the circumcision rate in Albania had declined to 36.8%.

Belgium (~ 22%) 
A study on genital sensitivity from 2013 recruited ~1400 adult men through leaflets randomly distributed at railway stations in Belgium. In this study 22.6% of the participants reported being circumcised.  The majority identified as being Caucasian with only a very small minority reporting being Asian, Arabic or African. In another more recent (2023) and similarly designed study on genital sensitivity 21.7% (152 out of 702) of participants reported being circumcised.

According to data from the National Institute for Health and Disability Insurance (NIHDI or RIZIV), the number of circumcisions performed in Belgium amounted to 25,286 in the year of 2011. The vast majority of the procedures were performed on individuals aged < 16 years old. If this rate remains stable it is estimated that over time the circumcision rate for boys aged 16 will reach 31.71%.

Over 80%
Azerbaijan and Turkey, 98.6%.

Unknown
Andorra, Croatia and Luxembourg are listed as unknown on the WHO prevalence map. Liechtenstein, Malta, Monaco, San Marino and Vatican City are unclear from the map.

Oceania

Australia
Circumcision reached its peak in Australia in the 1950s with a rate of more than 80%, but has steadily fallen to an estimated 26% in 2012. The rate of circumcision has dropped rapidly over the years. It is estimated that roughly 80 percent of males 35 and under are not circumcised.

The Australian Longitudinal Study of Health and Relationships is a computer assisted telephone interview of males aged 16–64 that uses a nationally representative population sample. In 2005 the interview found that the prevalence of circumcision in Australia was roughly 58%. Circumcision status was more common with males over 30 than males under 30, and more common with males who were born in Australia. 66% of males born in Australia were circumcised and less than 1/3 of males under 30 were circumcised. There has been a decline in the rate of infant circumcision in Australia. The Royal Australasian College of Physicians (RACP) estimated in 2010 that 10 to 20 percent of newborn boys are being circumcised, but the prevalence of male circumcision is much higher due to the presence of older circumcised males remaining in the population. Medicare Australia records show the number of males younger than six months that underwent circumcision dropped from 19,663 in 2007/08 to 6,309 (4%) in 2016/17.

New Zealand

According to the World Health Organisation, fewer than 20% of males are circumcised in New Zealand in 2007. In New Zealand routine circumcision for which there is no medical indication is uncommon and no longer publicly funded within the public hospital system.  In a study of men born in 1972–1973 in Dunedin, 40.2% were circumcised. In a study of men born in 1977 in Christchurch, 26.1% were circumcised. A 1991 survey conducted in Waikato found that 7% of male infants were circumcised.

Pacific Islands 
Circumcision for cultural reasons is routine in Pacific Island countries.

See also 
 Genital modification and mutilation

References and notes

Notes

References

Circumcision
Circumcision debate
Gender-related violence
Men's health
Men's rights
Misandry